Budi Anduk (8 February 1968 – 11 January 2016), born Budi Prihatin, was an Indonesian actor and comedian.

Career
Budi began his career in television comedy program Ngelaba in 1996. His name more widely known through his acting in the sitcom program Tawa Sutra. He has starred in two films, namely Tiren: Mati Kemaren and Tulalit.

Death
Budi died of lung cancer in Dharmais Hospital, Jakarta, on 11 January 2016.

Filmography

Television 
 Ngelaba
 Tawa Sutra
 Opera Van Java
 Untung Ada Budi

Films
 Tiren: Mati Kemaren (2008)
 Tulalit (2008)

References

1968 births
Indonesian male comedians
Indonesian comedians
Indonesian male film actors
Indonesian male television actors
Male actors from Jakarta
2016 deaths
Deaths from lung cancer in Indonesia
21st-century Indonesian male actors